Edgar Kendall Taylor CBE, FRCM, Hon FRAM (27 July 1905 – 5 December 1999) was a British pianist, who had an international career as a solo concert pianist. In the United Kingdom, he was well known for his concerts, which were broadcast on the BBC.  He was also known for his recitals and broadcasts to the troops during World War II through the Entertainments National Service Association. He also had a career as a teacher and pedagogue.

Early life 

Kendall Taylor was born in Sheffield, England. He made his concert début at the age of 6 accompanying his father, Maurice Taylor, a well-known cellist. His debut with a professional orchestra was at the age of 12 with a rendition of Mozart's D minor concerto, K.466. He was a pupil of Vera Dawson, who in turn was a pupil of Iwan Knorr, who studied with Johannes Brahms. In 1923, he won an open scholarship to the Royal College of Music (RCM). There he studied piano with Herbert Fryer (a pupil of Ferruccio Busoni), composition with Gustav Holst, and conducting with Adrian Boult and Malcolm Sargent.

Professional career 

While a student at the RCM, he performed concertos with leading British orchestras which were broadcast on the BBC.

In 1926, he made his first professional performance at a Promenade Concert conducted by Sir Henry Wood. This was the first of 26 appearances as a solo pianist at a Promenade concert—in two of which he was soloist for the 'Last Night of the Proms.' In 1927 he was the only British pianist chosen to play at the Esposition Internationale de Musique in Geneva, where he won the praise of Alfred Cortot, Arthur Rubinstein and Ernest Schelling. In 1929 he was appointed Professor of Piano at the RCM where he continued teaching there for a record 63 years until his retirement in 1993.

In 1938 he joined the Grinke piano trio with violinist Frederick Grinke and cellist Florence Hooton. He also performed duos with both Grinke and Hooton.

During World War II, he gave numerous broadcasts and recitals for troops with the Entertainments National Service Association. He travelled often, and frequently performed at multiple locations daily.

After the war, he performed in frequent overseas tours in the United States, Canada, Australia, and Southern Africa where he performed with many of the world's leading orchestras, and often including works by 20th century composers. He performed in Britain and around Europe with conductors including: Klemperor, Barbirolli, Boult, Sargent and Colin Davis. He was Barbirolli's chosen concerto soloist at concerts in Vienna with the Vienna Philharmonic orchestra. He gave recitals in all of the countries he visited, and often premiered new work, including works by British composers.

Teaching 

Taylor worked as a professor at the RCM from 1929 to 1993. He also gave lectures in many venues around the world, and sat on competition juries and award panels Many of his pupils had distinguished careers, some of his successful pupils include: Rose Goldblatt, Ireneus Zuk, Jan Latham-Koenig, Yu Chun Ye, Dusan Trbojevic, Yonty Solomon, Tony Hewitt, Michael Redshaw, Carl Rütti, Enloc Wu, Vanessa Latarche, Andrew Ball, Rudi Martinus van Dijk, Kathryn Stott, Piers Lane, Howard Shelley, Paul Stewart and Hilary Macnamara.

In later years he gave many lecture-recitals, focusing particularly on the life and work of Beethoven. He established a Beethoven prize for pianists at the RCM.

After his death a scholarship, the Kendall Taylor Award, was established in his memory to sponsor British pianists studying at the RCM.

Personal life

Taylor was married twice. He met his second wife, Mirjana, while on a concert tour of the Balkans in 1947. They were married for nearly 50 years until his death in 1999. Kendall Taylor had a daughter and a step-daughter, both of whom studied at the RCM. His two grandchildren are both professional musicians.

Death

Kendall Taylor died on 5 December 1999 in Wimbledon, England.

Honors 

 1982 appointed a Commander of the Order of the British Empire (CBE)
 1982 appointed President of EPTA (UK)
 1993 Founder President (UK) of the Beethoven Piano Society of Europe
 Vice-President and Senior Professor of the Royal College of Music – for several years and until his retirement
 Hon Professor of Belgrade Academy of Music
 Hon Fellow of the Royal Academy of Music

Publications 

 Kendall Taylor 'Principles of Piano Technique and Interpretation' publ Novello 1981
 Kendall Taylor An annotated edition of the complete Beethoven Piano Sonatas, 4 vols, publ Allans Australia 1987   
 Many articles in Journals (e.g. Piano Journal, Arietta, etc.)
 Compositions for Voice and Piano

Recordings 

 John Ireland, Phantasie Trio of 1908, the 1938 Trio no 3 in E major, and The Holy Boy (with Florence Hooton (cello) and Frederick Grinke (violin)),
 Frank Bridge Phantasy trio
 Beethoven trio in E flat Op 70 no 2
 Stanford trio
 Dvořák G major Sonatina Op 100 with Frederick Grinke
 Mozart Sonatas for violin and piano, with Frederick Grinke, Decca
 Beethoven Sonatas for piano Op 109, Op 110 and Op 111, Meridian
 In addition to the commercial recordings there are numerous recordings from broadcasts and live performances held in the BBC archive and the National Sound Archive at the British Library

References 

British classical pianists
Alumni of the Royal College of Music
Commanders of the Order of the British Empire
1905 births
1999 deaths
20th-century classical pianists
20th-century British musicians